LINA was a piece of open-source software that enabled users to run applications compiled for Linux under Windows and Mac OS X with a native look and feel. Version 1.00 beta1 was released in October 2009 and was available at the Open Lina web site. However, that domain is now up for sale.

Release
The latest binary version, still a beta, was released on October 15, 2009.
As the tool was open sourced under the terms of the GNU General Public License v2, its source code had been made available since July 19, 2007.

See also

Compatibility layer

References

External links
openlina.com at archive.org
Youtube channel

Free software programmed in C
Free software programmed in C++
Free software programmed in Python
Free system software
Compatibility layers